Dèhoumon Adjagnon, (13 March 1925 – 1 February 1985) popularly known by his stage name Baba Yabo, was a Beninese comedian and actor. One of the most popular comedy actors in Benin, he revolutionized the world of theater in Benin with his unique comedy style and storytelling.

Personal life
Yabo was born on 13 March 1925 in Porto-Novo, Benin. 

He is the father of Frédéric Joël Aïvo.

Career
In the 1980s, Yabo started theater acting with his Towa konou troupe and companion Mamoudou Eyissê alias Mister Okéké and Antoine Sokênou. He exercises the profession of driver to Finance in Benin, then the Lycée Toff I st Porto Novo.

Legacy
There is a 2 m high statue of Yabo erected in his memory in the Zèvou district in Porto-Novo.

References

External links
 Comédie béninois: Baba Yabo dans le décès de mon beau père
 Baba-Yabo

Beninese male actors
20th-century comedians
1925 births
1985 deaths
People from Porto-Novo